Triton commonly refers to:
 Triton (mythology), a Greek god
 Triton (moon), a satellite of Neptune

Triton may also refer to:

Biology
 Triton cockatoo, a parrot
 Triton (gastropod), a group of sea snails
 Triton, a synonym of Triturus, a genus of newts

Companies
 Triton, a bass boat manufacturer
 Triton (fashion), a Brazilian fashion brand owned by Colcci
 Triton Airlines, a Canadian airline operating from 1993 to 1994
 Triton Digital
 Triton Energy Limited, an American oil and natural gas exploration and production company
 Triton Media Group, owner of radio stations
 Triton Showers, the UK's largest manufacturer of electric showers
 Triton Submarines, an American manufacturer of private submarines
 Triton Systems, a manufacturer of automated teller machines

Film and television
 Triton (1961 TV series), a BBC television adventure series
 Triton (1968 TV series), a BBC television adventure series, remake of the earlier show
 King Triton, a The Little Mermaid character

Fountains
 Fontana del Tritone, Rome
 Fountain of the Tritons, Rome, completed in 1715
 Triton Fountain (Malta), Valletta, Malta, created in 1959

Literature
 Triton (collection), a 1949 collection of fantasy short stories by L. Ron Hubbard
 Triton (comics), a Marvel Comics character
 Triton (novel), a 1976 novel by Samuel R. Delany
 Tritón (magazine), a Mexican magazine dedicated to swimming, diving and water polo

Military and government
 , various Royal Navy vessels
 Triton-class submarine or T-class, a class of British vessels
 , various US Navy vessels
 , various Danish Navy vessels
 HDMS Triton (F358), a Danish Navy frigate
 HDMS Triton (1790), an earlier Danish frigate
 RV Triton, a trimaran vessel used by the Australian Custom Service, and formerly by the Royal Navy for research
 USCGC Triton, a list of US Coast Guard vessels
 USCGC Triton (WPC-116), a US Coast Guard patrol boat commissioned in 1934
 Northrop Grumman MQ-4C Triton, a United States Navy unmanned aerial vehicle
 Triton, a World War II encryption network using the Enigma machine
Triton, a Type 209 submarine of the Hellenic Navy

People
 Tritón (wrestler) (born 1987), Mexican luchador enmascarado

Characters
 Thomas Triton, a character in The Deptford Mice

Mascots
 Triton, mascot of Eckerd College
 Triton, mascot of Edmonds College
 Triton, mascot of Pacifica High School (Oxnard, California)
 Triton, mascot of Mariner High School (Cape Coral, Florida)
 Triton, mascot of San Clemente High School (San Clemente, California)
 Triton, mascot of the University of California, San Diego
 Triton, mascot of the University of Guam
 Triton, mascot of the University of Missouri–St. Louis

Places
 Triton Point, a point on the east coast of Alexander Island, Antarctica
 Triton, Newfoundland and Labrador, a village in Canada
 Triton Bay, an Arctic waterway in Qikiqtaaluk Region, Nunavut, Canada
 Triton River, a river flowing into Lake Copais, Greece
 Triton Bay, Kaimana, West Papua, Indonesia
 Triton Island, a Paracel Island in the South China Sea

Schools
 Triton High School (disambiguation)
 Triton Regional High School (New Jersey), a high school in Runnemede, New Jersey
 Triton College, Illinois, United States
 Triton Regional School District, a school district in Massachusetts, United States

Sport
 UC San Diego Tritons, an athletic sports team for the University of California, San Diego
 Tampa Bay Tritons, a defunct professional roller hockey team
 Triton Financial Classic, a golf tournament on the Champions Tour from 2003 to 2009
 UMSL Tritons, University of Missouri–St. Louis athletic squad
 White Rock Tritons, a youth baseball team in South Surrey, British Columbia, Canada
 Seigneurie du Triton, a hunting and fishing club in Quebec, Canada

Technology
 Triton (content delivery), a digital delivery and digital rights management service until 2006
 Triton disk drive, a product that allows 2.8-inch floppy disks to be read on various home computers
 E Ink Triton, an electronic paper technology
 Korg Triton, a music workstation synthesizer
 Triton chipset, an Intel Pentium chipset
 Triton X-100, a nonionic surfactant
 TRITON, a SODAR system for measuring sound wave scattering
 AIM Triton, a version of the AOL Instant Messenger software
 Triton, a line of GPS receivers manufactured by Magellan Navigation
 Triton (malware), used to attack the Triconex control system at a power plant
 Triton (programming language) a Python based programming language for use in AI projects developed by OpenAI

Vehicles

Air
 Sikorsky S-61T Triton, a helicopter
 Sud-Ouest Triton, a jet aircraft
 Micronautix Triton, a 4-6 place flight experience aircraft
 Triton, the Super Constellation airliner involved in the KLM Flight 633 crash

Land
 Mitsubishi Triton, a pickup truck
 Triton motorcycle, a hybrid Triumph–Norton motorcycle of the 1960s-1970s
 Ford Triton engine

Sea
 Triton (steamboat), a vessel that operated on Lake Washington in the first part of the 20th century
 MV Coral, formerly Triton, a cruise ship from 1991 to 2004
 Pearson Triton, a sailboat
 Triton 22, an American sailboat design
 Triton 24 sailing yacht, a sloop manufactured in Sydney, Australia, throughout the 1980s
 Triton 25, an American sailboat design

Other uses
 Triton (physics), the nucleus of tritium, an isotope of hydrogen
 Triton (chamber music society), a chamber music society founded in Paris 1932 by Pierre-Octave Ferroud 
 Triton (demogroup), a demo group active in the PC demoscene from 1992 to about 1996
 Triton (Dungeons & Dragons), a fictional species in the Dungeons & Dragons fantasy role-playing game
 Triton (fairy chess piece), a combined Rook and Locust 
 Energy-Quest Triton Expedition, a deep sea voyage
 Operation Triton, a border security operation in the Mediterranean Sea
 Triton X-100, a wetting agent
 Triton Knoll, a proposed offshore wind farm off the coast of Lincolnshire, England, UK
 Triton Light, a navigational beacon on the seawall of the United States Naval Academy, US
 Triton Museum of Art, a museum in Santa Clara, California, US
 Triton City, a concept for a floating city proposed by Buckminster Fuller

See also

 Benzyltrimethylammonium hydroxide or Triton B
 Tritone (disambiguation)
 Tritones (disambiguation)
 Tritonia (disambiguation)
 Tri-toon, a type of boat
 Tritton
 Tryton, a general purpose computer application platform